Janelle S. Ayres is an American immunologist and microbiologist, member of the NOMIS Center for Immunobiology and Microbial Pathogenesis and Helen McLoraine Developmental Chair at the Salk Institute for Biological Sciences. Her research focuses on the relation of host-pathogen interactions with the microbiome.

Education 
Ayres received her BA in molecular and cell biology at the University of California, Berkeley and her PhD at Stanford University School of Medicine in the laboratory of David Schneider, working on resistance and infection tolerance using the model organism Drosophila. She then completed a postdoctoral fellowship with Russell Vance at the University of California, Berkeley where she published on the role of innate immunity in the recognition of drug resistant pathobionts, or potentially virulent species from the microbiome.

Research 
Ayres current research focuses on how microbes can promote the health of their host organism. She uses mathematical and evolutionary models to predict how the beneficial microbes in the gut can be used to fight diseases. Specifically, her lab has demonstrated how a strain of E. coli prevents inflammation-induced wasting, and how a strain Salmonella inhibits sickness-induced anorexia, thus protecting their host from the deleterious effects of infection.

Publications 
 Troha, K., Ayres, J.S. Metabolic Adaptations to Infections at the Organismal Level. (2020) Trends in Immunology. DOI: 10.1016/j.it.2019.12.001
 Ayres, J.S. Immunometabolism of infections. (2019) Nature Reviews Immunology. DOI: 10.1038/s41577-019-0266-9
 McCarville, J.L., Ayres, J.S. Host-Pathogen Relationship Advice: Fat Protects against a Broken Heart. (2019) Cell Metabolism. 30(3):409-411. DOI: 10.1016/j.cmet.2019.08.007
 Wallace, M., Green, C.R., Roberts, L.S., Lee, Y.M., McCarville, J.L., Sanchez-Gurmaches, J., Meurs, N., Gengatharan, J.M., Hover, J.D., Phillips, S.A., Ciaraldi, T.P., Guertin, D.A., Cabrales, P., Ayres, J.S., Nomura, D.K., Loomba, R., Metallo, C.M. Enzyme promiscuity drives branched-chain fatty acid synthesis in adipose tissues. (2018) Nature Chemical Biology. 14(11):1021-1031. DOI: 10.1038/s41589-018-0132-2
 Sanchez, K.K., Chen, G.Y., Schieber, A.M.P., Redford, S.E., Shokhirev, M.N., Leblanc, M., Lee, Y.M., Ayres, J.S. Cooperative Metabolic Adaptations in the Host Can Favor Asymptomatic Infection and Select for Attenuated Virulence in an Enteric Pathogen. (2018) Cell. 175(1):146-158. DOI: 10.1016/j.cell.2018.07.016
 Chen, G.Y., Ayres, J.S. When the Gut Gets Tough, the Enterocytes Get Going. (2018) Immunity. 48(5):837-839. DOI: 10.1016/j.immuni.2018.04.036
 McCarville, J.L., Ayres, J.S. Disease tolerance: concept and mechanisms. (2018) Current Opinion in Immunology. 50:88-93. DOI: 10.1016/j.coi.2017.12.003
 Lee, Y.M., Ayres, J.S. Decoding the intestinal epithelium cell by cell. (2018) Nature Immunology. 19(1):7-9. DOI: 10.1038/s41590-017-0011-0
 Rao, S., Ayres, J.S. Resistance and tolerance defenses in cancer: Lessons from infectious diseases. (2017) Seminars in Immunology. 32:54-61. DOI: 10.1016/j.smim.2017.08.004
 Rauch, I., Deets, K.A., Ji, D.X., von Moltke, J., Tenthorey, J.L., Lee, A.Y., Philip, N.H., Ayres, J.S., Brodsky, I.E., Gronert, K., Vance, R.E. NAIP-NLRC4 Inflammasomes Coordinate Intestinal Epithelial Cell Expulsion with Eicosanoid and IL-18 Release via Activation of Caspase-1 and -8. (2017) Immunity. 46(4):649-659. DOI: 10.1016/j.immuni.2017.03.016
 Rao, S., Schieber, A.M., O'Connor, C.P., Leblanc, M., Michel, D., Ayres, J.S. Pathogen-Mediated Inhibition of Anorexia Promotes Host Survival and Transmission. (2017) Cell. 168(3):503-516.e12. DOI: 10.1016/j.cell.2017.01.006
 Ayres, J.S. Microbes Dress for Success: Tolerance or Resistance? (2017) Trends in Microbiology. 25(1):1-3. DOI: 10.1016/j.tim.2016.11.006
 Schieber, A.M., Ayres, J.S. Thermoregulation as a disease tolerance defense strategy. (2016) Pathog Dis. 74(9). DOI: 10.1093/femspd/ftw106
 Ayres, J.S. Disease Tolerance Trick or Treat: Give Your Brain Something Good to Eat. (2016) Cell. 166(6):1368-70. DOI: 10.1016/j.cell.2016.08.034
 Ayres, J.S. Cooperative Microbial Tolerance Behaviors in Host-Microbiota Mutualism. (2016) Cell. 165(6):1323-1331. DOI: 10.1016/j.cell.2016.05.049
 Shen, R., Wang, B., Giribaldi, M.G., Ayres, J., Thomas, J.B., Montminy, M. Neuronal energy-sensing pathway promotes energy balance by modulating disease tolerance. (2016) Proceedings of the National Academy of Sciences of the United States of America. 113(23):E3307-14. DOI: 10.1073/pnas.1606106113
 Schieber, A.M., Lee, Y.M., Chang, M.W., Leblanc, M., Collins, B., Downes, M., Evans, R.M., Ayres, J.S. Disease tolerance mediated by microbiome E. coli involves inflammasome and IGF-1 signaling. (2015) Science. 350(6260):558-63. DOI: 10.1126/science.aac6468
 Ayres, J.S. Inflammasome-microbiota interplay in host physiologies. (2013) Cell Host & Microbe. 14(5):491-7. DOI: 10.1016/j.chom.2013.10.013
 Manzanillo, P.S., Ayres, J.S., Watson, R.O., Collins, A.C., Souza, G., Rae, C.S., Schneider, D.S., Nakamura, K., Shiloh, M.U., Cox, J.S. The ubiquitin ligase parkin mediates resistance to intracellular pathogens. (2013) Nature. 501(7468):512-6. DOI: 10.1038/nature12566
 von Moltke, J., Ayres, J.S., Kofoed, E.M., Chavarría-Smith, J., Vance, R.E. Recognition of bacteria by inflammasomes. (2013) Annual Review of Immunology. 31:73-106. DOI: 10.1146/annurev-immunol-032712-095944
 Ayres, J.S., Trinidad, N.J., Vance, R.E. Lethal inflammasome activation by a multidrug-resistant pathobiont upon antibiotic disruption of the microbiota. (2012) Nature Medicine. 18(5):799-806. DOI: 10.1038/nm.2729
 Ayres, J.S., Vance, R.E. Cellular teamwork in antibacterial innate immunity. (2012) Nature Immunology. 13(2):115-7. DOI: 10.1038/ni.2212

Award and honors 

 Blavatnik National Award for Young Scientists (2018)
 NIH Director's Pioneer Award (2018)
 Senior Research Award, Crohn's and Colitis Foundation of America (2016)
 DARPA Young Faculty Award (2015)
 Kavli Fellow, National Academy of Sciences (2015)
 Searle Scholars Award, Searle Scholars Program (2014)
 Career Development Award in the Biomedical Sciences, The Ray Thomas Edwards Foundation (2014)

References

External links 
 'Superhero' microbiome bacteria protect against deadly symptoms during infection
 Janelle Ayres awarded $1.8 million by NOMIS Foundation for research on mechanisms to promote health 
 Salk Institute’s Janelle Ayres gets $3.5 million NIH grant

21st-century American biologists
21st-century American women scientists
American women biologists
American immunologists
American microbiologists
Women immunologists
Women microbiologists
Year of birth missing (living people)
Living people